Jackie Kessler (born December 8, 1970) is the American author of the Hell on Earth  urban fantasy paranormal romance series published by Kensington/Zebra. To date, the books include Hell's Belles (January 2007; mass-market reissue in September 2008), The Road to Hell (November 2007) and Hotter Than Hell (August 2008), Hell to Pay (February 2011), as well as a tie-in novella in the anthology, Eternal Lover (April 2008) called A Hell of a Time. She has had numerous short stories published in various magazines, including Realms of Fantasy and Farthing. In 2009, Kessler published the superhero novel Black and White with co-author Caitlin Kittredge.  The sequel, Shades of Gray, was released in 2010.

In 2010, Kessler did her first writing for comic books, scripting "Vampire Noctem" for Tales from the Vampires from Dark Horse Comics, a story set in the Buffy the Vampire Slayer universe.

Biography
Kessler lives in Upstate New York. Previously, Kessler was the fantasy editor for Wild Child Publishing.

Bibliography

Hell on Earth
Hell’s Belles (Kensington/Zebra Books, January 2007 - trade; September 2008 - mass-market paperback) (2007, 2008)
The Road to Hell (Kensington/Zebra Books, November 2007 – trade; November 2009 - mass-market paperback) (2007, 2009)
Hotter Than Hell (Kensington/Zebra Books, August 2008 – trade paperback) (2008)
“A Hell of a Time”, Eternal Lover (Kensington Publishing Corp., April 2008 - trade; April 2009 - mass-market paperback) (2008, 2009)
“Hell Is Where The Heart Is”, A Red Hot Valentine's Day (Avon Red, January 2009) (2009)
"Hell to Pay", an online serial novel started 5/2010 - completed in 2011

Published works
Shades of Gray, (2010), with Caitlin Kittredge. Icarus Project series
Black and White, with Caitlin Kittredge (Bantam/Spectra, June 2009 – trade paperback). Icarus Project series
A Hell of a Time, Eternal Lover (Kensington Publishing Corp., April 2009 - mass market)
Hell Is Where The Heart Is, (Avon Red, January 2009 – trade paperback)
Hell’s Belles, (Kensington/Zebra Books, September 2008 – mass-market paperback)
Hotter Than Hell, (Kensington/Zebra Books, August 2008 – trade paperback)
A Hell of a Time, Eternal Lover (Kensington Publishing Corp., April 2008 - trade paperback)
The Road to Hell, (Kensington/Zebra Books, November 2007 – trade paperback)
Red, Realms of Fantasy (April 2007)
To the Core, Dreams & Desires Vol. 1 (Freya's Bower, February 2007)
Hell’s Belles, (Kensington/Zebra Books, January 2007 – trade paperback)
Why Monsters Don’t Do Group Therapy, From the Asylum (December 2006)
The Ties That Bind, Farthing (Spring 2006)
Giving the Devil His To-Do’s, From the Asylum (December 2005)
Reflections, ** Ruthie's Club (November 2005)
Hunger, Byzarium (September 2005)
The Compromise, Wild Child Publishing (August 2005)
Guilty Pleasures, Peridot Books*** (Winter 2005)

Honorary Mention, Year's Best Fantasy and Horror (October 2007)
Under the byline J.M. Kaye
Now called Allegory

Young adult fiction
Hunger, Houghton Mifflin Harcourt (October 2010)
Rage, Houghton Mifflin Harcourt (April 2011)

See also
List of romantic novelists

References

External links
Jackie Kessler's Official Website
Jackie Morse Kessler's Website
Website profile on Romantic Times
Fantastic Fiction Page for Jackie Kessler

21st-century American novelists
American romantic fiction writers
American women novelists
1970 births
Living people
21st-century American women writers